Events from the year 1945 in Romania. The year saw the end of Romania's involvement in the Second World War and the foundation of the pro-Communist government of Petru Groza.

Incumbents
King: Michael I of Romania.

Prime Minister:
Nicolae Rădescu (until 6 March).
Petru Groza (from 6 March).

Events
 13 February – The Budapest Offensive and the Siege of Budapest end with Nazi troops surrendering Budapest, Hungary, to Soviet-Romanian forces.
 28 February – In Bucharest, a violent demonstration takes place, during which the several protesters are killed, compelling Nicolae Rădescu to resign as premier. Andrei Y. Vishinsky, USSR vice commissioner of foreign affairs and president of the Allied Control Commission for Romania, travels to Bucharest to promote a left wing government with communist participation.
 6 March – A pro-Communist government is formed under Petru Groza, following Soviet intervention.
 12 May – The last German troops capitulate, bringing Romania's involvement in the Second World War to an end.
 21 August – In response to the government not resigning as he requested, King Michael starts the "royal strike", refusing the sign any decrees, a situation that continues into the following year.
 8 November – A pro-monarchy demonstration in front of the Royal Palace escalates into street fighting which kills and wounds dozens. Order is restored by Soviet troops.

Births
 10 May – Judith Dibar, tennis player.
 24 June –  Constantin Gruiescu, Olympic boxer.
 4 September – Doina Furcoi, Olympic handball player.
 19 September – Ruxandra Sireteanu, behavioural neuroscientist (died 2008).
 22 November  –  Melania Decuseară, Olympic diver.

Deaths
 1 February – Ion Șiugariu, poet and soldier, killed in action in Slovakia during World War II (born 1914).
 3 March – Gheorghe Avramescu, general, died in Slovakia during World War II while in NKVD custody (born 1884).
 15 March – Sava Caracaș, general (born 1890).
 4 April – Berta Bock, composer (born 1857).
 7 April – Elizabeth, Princess Bibesco, novelist, playwright and poet (born 1897).
 17 April – Ion Pillat, poet (born 1891).
 29 May – Mihail Sebastian, playwright, journalist and novelist (born 1907).

References

Bibliography
 
 

Years of the 20th century in Romania
1945 in Romania
Romania
Romania